Radko Bobekov (7 October 1928 – 19 October 1993) was Bulgarian chess player.

Biography
In the 1950s and 1960s Radko Bobekov was one of the leading Bulgarian chess players. He has participated in the Bulgarian Chess Championship finals many times (1953, 1957, 1963, 1967). In 1958, in Sofia Radko Bobekov shared 1st - 3rd place in International Chess Tournament.

Radko Bobekov played for Bulgaria in the Chess Olympiad:
 In 1954, at second reserve board in the 11th Chess Olympiad in Amsterdam (+5, =1, -5).

Radko Bobekov played for Bulgaria in the European Team Chess Championship preliminaries:
 In 1961, at reserve board in the 2nd European Team Chess Championship (+0, =1, -0),
 In 1970, at reserve board in the 4th European Team Chess Championship (+0, =0, -1).

Radko Bobekov played for Bulgaria in the World Student Team Chess Championship:
 In 1956, at second reserve board in the 3rd World Student Team Chess Championship in Uppsala (+1, =0, -2).

References

External links

Radko Bobekov chess games at 365chess.com

1928 births
1993 deaths
Bulgarian chess players
Chess Olympiad competitors
20th-century chess players